Bo Over the Top was a collegiate football play in the 1982 Iron Bowl. The play involved then-freshman Bo Jackson and was the deciding factor in the game between the Auburn Tigers and Alabama Crimson Tide. "Over the top" refers to the nature of the play, as Jackson, a state champion high jumper in high school, leaped over the line of scrimmage on a fourth-down play from the one-yard line to score the winning touchdown and potentially win the game.

Background 
Entering the game, Auburn had a nine-year losing streak versus Alabama. The key player in the game was freshman sensation Bo Jackson, a tri-sport phenom in high school (football, baseball, and the decathlon). In 1982, Jackson had set the state high-school record for indoor high jump (6 ft 9 in).

The Play
On fourth down with less than one yard to the end zone, Jackson took the handoff from quarterback Randy Campbell. The lead blockers on the play were running back Lionel James and fullback Ron O'Neal. Jackson jumped over the defensive line and scored the winning touchdown. Auburn led 23-22 with 2:26 minutes left in the game. Alabama was unable to score in the remaining time and Auburn finally broke their nine year losing streak.

References
 https://web.archive.org/web/20141224130822/http://www.auburntigers.com/sports/m-footbl/spec-rel/112813aab.html
 https://web.archive.org/web/20150421102708/http://www.lostlettermen.com/article/aus-bo-jackson-goes-over-the-top-in-82
 http://bleacherreport.com/articles/1866767-alabama-vs-auburn-top-10-moments-in-iron-bowl-history

1982 Southeastern Conference football season
Alabama Crimson Tide football games
Auburn Tigers football games
Iron Bowl
Bo Jackson
November 1982 sports events in the United States
1982 in sports in Alabama